Cornufer schmidti is a species of frog in the family Ceratobatrachidae. It was first described as a subspecies of Platymantis papuensis (now Cornufer papuensis). It is the type species of the subgenus Aenigmanura within Cornufer. It is endemic to the Bismarck Archipelago, Papua New Guinea, and is known from the islands of New Britain, New Ireland, and Manus; the Manus population might represent a distinct species.

Etymology
Cornufer schmidti is named after Karl Patterson Schmidt, American herpetologist. Common name Schmidt's wrinkled ground frog has been coined for it.

Description
Adult males measure  and adult females  in snout–vent length. The snout is rounded to broadly round-pointed. The tympanum is distinct and moderately large. The fingers tips are dilated into moderate, depressed discs. The toes are slightly webbed and have smaller discs than the fingers. Dorsal folds are moderate to short, usually scattered over the entire dorsum.

Habitat and conservation
Cornufer schmidti occurs in lowland rainforests, disturbed forests, plantations, and gardens, often in association with coconut husk piles. Development is direct (i.e, there is no free-living larval stage). It is an abundant and adaptable species that seems not to be threatened. It is probably present in a number of protected areas.

References

schmidti
Amphibians of Papua New Guinea
Endemic fauna of Papua New Guinea
Bismarck Archipelago
Amphibians described in 1968
Taxa named by Michael J. Tyler
Taxonomy articles created by Polbot